Milan Lešický (born 11 July 1945) is a former football player from Slovakia and manager. Since 2006 until May 2008, he worked also in Viktoria Žižkov as a sports director.

References

External links
 

1945 births
Living people
Slovak footballers
Slovak football managers
Slovak expatriate footballers
FC Nitra players
FK Inter Bratislava players
FC Spartak Trnava managers
FC Nitra managers
MŠK Žilina managers
MŠK Púchov managers
People from Trenčianske Teplice
Sportspeople from the Trenčín Region
Slovakia national under-21 football team managers

Association footballers not categorized by position